Jessika Dubuc (born June 26, 1983) was a Canadian synchronized swimmer.

Career
She finished in fourth place at the 2003 world championships at Barcelona, Spain in the free routine combination event. She is a two-time Olympian, finishing fourth in 2004 Summer Olympics and fifth in 2008 Summer Olympics, both in the team events. Dubuc won two silver medals at the Pan American Games, one in 2003 and one in 2007. She retired from synchronized swimming in October 2008.

References

1983 births
Canadian synchronized swimmers
Living people
Olympic synchronized swimmers of Canada
Swimmers from Montreal
Synchronized swimmers at the 2004 Summer Olympics
Synchronized swimmers at the 2007 Pan American Games
Synchronized swimmers at the 2008 Summer Olympics
Pan American Games medalists in synchronized swimming
Synchronized swimmers at the 2003 Pan American Games
Pan American Games silver medalists for Canada
Medalists at the 2003 Pan American Games
Medalists at the 2007 Pan American Games